Esmont is a historic home located near Esmont, Albemarle County, Virginia. The house was built about 1818, and is a two-story, three bay, square structure in the Jeffersonian style. It has a double pile, central passage plan.  It is topped by a low hipped roof, surmounted by internal chimneys, further emphasized by the use of a balustrade with alternating solid and Chinese lattice panels. The front facade features a full-length tetrastyle porch with Doric order columns and entablature.  Also on the property are a contributing brick kitchen
with a low hipped roof, office, a dairy and a smokehouse.  The house was built for Dr. Charles Cocke, a nephew of James Powell Cocke who built the Edgemont.

It was added to the National Register of Historic Places in 1977.

References

Houses on the National Register of Historic Places in Virginia
Palladian Revival architecture in Virginia
Houses completed in 1818
Houses in Albemarle County, Virginia
National Register of Historic Places in Albemarle County, Virginia